Sadovy is a rural locality (a selo) in Akyarsky Selsoviet, Khaybullinsky District, Bashkortostan, Russia. The population was 641 as of 2010. There are 8 streets.

Geography 
Sadovy is located 8 km north of Akyar (the district's administrative centre) by road. Akyar is the nearest rural locality.

References 

Rural localities in Khaybullinsky District